Rzy  is a village in the administrative district of Gmina Sochocin within Płońsk County, Masovian Voivodeship in east-central Poland.

The village has a population of 120.

References

Rzy